Leicester Viney Vernon (1798 – 14 April 1860) was a British Conservative Party politician from Berkshire.

He was originally Leicester Viney Smith. Elected as Member of Parliament (MP) for Chatham in Kent a by-election in June 1853, after the result of the 1852 general election in the constituency were overturned on petition. Vernon's by-election victory was itself the subject of a petition, which he did not defend, but the petition was subsequently withdrawn.

At the  next general election, in 1857, he stood instead in Berkshire, where did not win a seat. He was returned to the House of Commons after a two-year absence at the 1859 general election, when Berkshire's 3 MPs were elected unopposed. He died the following year, aged 61.

From his uncle Robert Vernon he inherited Ardington House, in Ardington, Berkshire.

References

External links 
 
 WorldCat page

1798 births
1860 deaths
Conservative Party (UK) MPs for English constituencies
UK MPs 1857–1859
UK MPs 1859–1865
People from Wantage
Members of the Parliament of the United Kingdom for Berkshire